Andorra participated at the 2018 Summer Youth Olympics in Buenos Aires, Argentina from 6 October to 18 October 2018.

Basketball

Andorra qualified a boys' and girls' team based on the U18 3x3 National Federation Ranking.

 Boys' tournament

 Girls' tournament

Girls' shoot-out contest

Boys' dunk contest

References

2018 in Andorran sport
Nations at the 2018 Summer Youth Olympics
Andorra at the Youth Olympics